Broni is a comune (municipality) in the Province of Pavia in the Italian region Lombardy, located about 45 km south of Milan and about 15 km southeast of Pavia.

Broni borders the following municipalities: Albaredo Arnaboldi, Barbianello, Campospinoso, Canneto Pavese, Cigognola, Pietra de' Giorgi, Redavalle, San Cipriano Po, Stradella.

Twin towns
Broni is twinned with:

  Ferrara, Italy, since 2001

References

External links
 Official website

Cities and towns in Lombardy